Bowie County is a county in the U.S. state of Texas. Its legal county seat is Boston, though its courthouse is located in New Boston. As of the 2020 census, the population was 92,893. Bowie County is part of the Texarkana metropolitan statistical area. The county is named for James Bowie, the legendary knife fighter who died at the Battle of the Alamo.

History

Native Americans

The farming Caddoan Mississippian culture dates as early as the Late Archaic Period 1500 BCE in Bowie County. The Hernando de Soto expedition of 1541 resulted in violent encounters. Spanish and French missionaries brought  smallpox, measles malaria, and influenza epidemics. Eventually, these issues and problems with the Osage, forced the Caddo to abandon their homelands. Settlers had peaceful relations with the 19th Century Shawnee, Delaware, and Kickapoo in the area.

Explorations and county established

French explorer Jean Baptiste Bénard de La Harpe founded the military fort Le Poste des Cadodaquious in 1719. The fort remained in continuous use until 1770. The Red River Expedition of 1806 which passed through Bowie County, headed by Thomas Freeman and Dr. Peter Custis, was of great diplomatic and economic importance to President Thomas Jefferson. Bowie County, named for James Bowie, was established in December 1840 and reduced to its present size in 1846. DeKalb was the temporary county seat, with Boston becoming the permanent county seat in 1841.

Bowie County, in the years leading up to the American Civil War, was settled mostly by Southerners who brought their slave labor to work the cotton fields. By 1860, slaves outnumbered whites 2,651 to 2,401. The county voted 208–15 in favor of secession from the Union. While Bowie was never a battlefield in that war, it was occupied during Reconstruction. Between 1860 and 1870, the population declined. The occupation, and the new legal equality of blacks, became a hostile situation that fostered Cullen Baker.

Cullen Montgomery Baker (b. circa 1835 - d. 1869) was a twice-widowed, mean-spirited drunk who killed his first man before he was 20. When Thomas Orr married Baker's late wife's sister, thereby denying Baker that opportunity, Baker attempted to hang Orr. Legends abound as to his activities in Bowie and Cass Counties, including a rumored tie to the Ku Klux Klan. His exploits turned him into a folk hero dubbed "The Swamp Fox of the Sulphur River". He was a Confederate States Army veteran who joined two units, designated as a deserter from the first, and receiving a disability discharge from the second. Reconstruction allowed him to focus his anger toward what many at the time believed was a Union intrusion into their lives. Baker and his gang conducted a vicious rampage against citizens he perceived as being on the wrong side of the black labor issue, at William G. Kirkman and the Freedman's Bureau in Bowie County, and at the soldiers of the Union occupation. Kirkman unsuccessfully pursued Baker, killing one of Baker's men in the second attempt. Like Swamp Fox Francis Marion, Baker always managed to elude capture, often with the help of local citizens. Kirkland was murdered by "person or persons unknown", but Baker boasted of having done the deed. In December 1869, Thomas Orr and a group of neighbors killed Baker. A local legend has it the deed was accomplished with strychnine-laced whiskey.

When the Texas and Pacific Railway was constructed through the county, a new town named Texarkana was founded.

Bowie was hit hard by the Great Depression. Measurable relief came late when the Lone Star Army Ammunition Plant was established in 1942. The base was active until 2009. The Red River Army Depot, opened in 1941, remains active. The two installations occupied almost  and provided job opportunities for thousands.

Geography

Bowie County, Texas is one of only three counties in Texas to border two other U.S. states (the others being Dallam and Cass). Bowie County forms part of the tripoint of Texas-Oklahoma-Arkansas.

Communities

Cities 

 De Kalb
 Hooks
 Leary
 Maud
 Nash

 New Boston (courthouse in city)
 Red Lick
 Redwater
 Texarkana (largest city)
 Wake Village

Unincorporated communities 

 Bassett
 Beaver Dam
 Boston
 Burns
 Carbondale
 College Hill
 Corley
 Dalby Springs
 Hoot
 Hubbard
 Malta
 Oak Grove
 Old Boston
 Old Salem
 Old Union
 Red Bank
 Siloam
 Simms
 Spring Hill
 South Texarkana
 Victory City
 Wamba
 Ward Creek

Ghost towns 
 Darden
 Eylau
 Hartman
 Hodgson
 Sulphur

Demographics

Note: the US Census treats Hispanic/Latino as an ethnic category. This table excludes Latinos from the racial categories and assigns them to a separate category. Hispanics/Latinos can be of any race.

At of the census of 2000,  89,306 people, 33,058 households, and 23,438 families resided in the county. The 36,463 housing units averaged 41 per square mile (16/km2). The racial makeup of the county was 73.26% White, 23.42% Black or African American, 0.58% Native American, 0.43% Asian, 0.04% Pacific Islander, 1.12% from other races, and 1.15% from two or more races. About 4.47% of the population was Hispanic or Latino of any race. In 2020, its population increased to 92,893; the racial and ethnic makeup of the county transitioned to 60.13% non-Hispanic white, 24.85% Black or African American, 0.60% American Indian or Alaska Native, 1.16% Asian alone, 0.7% Pacific Islander, 0.36% some other race or ethnicity, 4.65% multiracial, and 8.18% Hispanic or Latino American of any race.

Government and politics
Barry Telford Unit, a Texas Department of Criminal Justice prison for men, is in an unincorporated area of the county, near New Boston. Federal Correctional Institution, Texarkana, is a Federal Bureau of Prisons facility in unincorporated Bowie County, near Texarkana, Texas.

Bowie County is no longer one of the seven dry counties in the state of Texas. Both the city of Nash and the city of Texarkana (on November 6, 2013, and November 5, 2014, respectively) have passed laws that allow the sale of beer and wine.

Politics
Bowie County had voting patterns similar to the Solid South up until 1976. The county has trended steadily towards the GOP with each election in the 21st century. The last Democrat to win this county was Bill Clinton of neighboring Arkansas, with which the county shares the Texarkana metropolitan area, in both of his national victories.

Education
These school districts serve Bowie County:

Transportation
Major highways present in Bowie County include the following:

See also 

 Le Poste des Cadodaquious, a French fort established in Bowie County in 1719
 National Register of Historic Places listings in Bowie County, Texas
 Recorded Texas Historic Landmarks in Bowie County

References

External links
 Bowie County government
 
 Bowie County from the  Texas Almanac
 Bowie County from the TXGenWeb Project

 
1840 establishments in the Republic of Texas
Populated places established in 1840
County in Texarkana metropolitan area